Steinhardt may refer to:

Steinhardt School of Culture, Education, and Human Development, a division of New York University
Steinhardt Social Research Institute, the Brandeis University institute for the study of religion and ethnicity
Steinhardt (surname), people with the surname Steinhardt

See also
Steinhart–Hart equation, a model of the resistivity of semiconductors
California Academy of Sciences, home of the Steinhardt Aquarium
Steinhardt Foundation for Jewish Life